UAB Hospital (also known as University Hospital) is a 1,207 bed tertiary hospital and academic health science center located in Birmingham, Alabama. It serves as the only ACS verified Level I Trauma Center in Alabama,  and is the flagship property of the UAB Health System which is owned by the University of Alabama System. The system includes clinics, an eye hospital and affiliations with other health care facilities throughout the state. It is Birmingham's largest employer, with a staff of over 20,000.

Ratings

UAB Hospital also serves as the primary teaching hospital for the UAB School of Medicine. Seven UAB Hospital specialty programs are among the nation's top 50 — five are in the top 25 — of the 16 categories evaluated at America's 5,189 hospitals in 2006 by U.S. News & World Report. With its seven ranked programs, UAB Hospital was one of only 176 hospitals, or about 3 percent of U.S. institutions studied — and the only hospital in Alabama — to rank high enough in even one specialty to make the magazine's national "Best Hospitals" list. The seven specialties are: rheumatology (6th); heart and heart surgery (14th); gynecology (14th); kidney disease (17th); cancer (23rd); and orthopedics (47th).

The 2005-2006 list of "Best Doctors in America" includes 234 UAB physicians, more than two-thirds of all specialists from the Birmingham metropolitan area in the Best Doctors database.  Best Doctors is an independent, knowledge-based medical referral service located in Aiken, South Carolina. Its surveys ask peer physicians, "If you or a loved one needed a doctor in your specialty, to whom would you refer them?" Only about 3 to 5 percent of all specialists worldwide make the list, which currently names 33,000 in the U.S. — including 345 physicians in the Birmingham area.

UAB Hospital received a 2005-2006 Consumer Choice Award from the National Research Corporation (NRC). It is among just 207 of 3,000 hospitals, nationally, to receive the recognition. The award is bestowed upon hospitals that receive highest marks among consumers for their quality and image, based on a nationwide survey of more than 200,000 households representing some 400,000 consumers. UAB Hospital is the only Birmingham-area hospital to receive the award this year.  The recognition places UAB Hospital alongside such institutions as Johns Hopkins, Duke University Hospital, the Cleveland Clinic, the Mayo Clinic, and Yale-New Haven Hospital.

History 
The hospital was established in 1945 as the teaching hospital for the University of Alabama School of Medicine, which was moved from the University of Alabama main campus in Tuscaloosa, Alabama to Birmingham.  It was originally located in the Jefferson and Hillman Hospitals, which were acquired by the University of Alabama Board of Trustees from Jefferson County.  The rapid growth of the Greater Birmingham area led the hospital to continue to expand to some 20 surrounding medical buildings.  In 1992, UAB opened "The Kirklin Clinic", a 5-story outpatient facility.

In November 2004, UAB Hospital opened its new 885,000-foot, 11-story building named North Pavilion. It includes 37 operating suites, two procedure rooms, three medical surgical units, four intensive care units — trauma and burn intensive care, surgical intensive care, neuroscience intensive care, and cardiovascular intensive care, and a  emergency department. Its emergency department is located on the first floor, along with the large public lobby and front door. The second floor serves as the main concourse into the UAB Hospital complex with its primary entrance on 4th Avenue South.  The new hospital is equipped with state-of-the-art digital and wireless technology. Operating rooms contain voice-activated video technology allowing the surgeon to view x-rays, ECGs or pathology specimens without having to break scrub or leave the room.

In February 2010, a new Women and Infant's Center was completed and opened, adjacent to the new Children's of Alabama Russell Campus hospital.

References

External links
 UAB Medicine

Hospital buildings completed in 1945
Hospital buildings completed in 2004
Teaching hospitals in Alabama
Buildings and structures in Birmingham, Alabama
University of Alabama at Birmingham
1945 establishments in Alabama